Nova News is a Bulgarian news channel owned by Nova Broadcasting Group.

History
The launch of the channel was announced on 3 December 2020, when Nova Broadcasting Group announced that from 4 January 2021 Channel 3 will be named with the actual name retaining the team of the defunct channel.

The hosts of the news are Desislava Peycheva, Yulia Manolova, Yana Moiseeva and Daniela Pehlivanova.

References

Television channels and stations established in 1999
Bulgarian-language television stations
1999 establishments in Bulgaria
Television networks in Bulgaria
Movie channels in Bulgaria
Modern Times Group